John Hurst (born November 23, 1933) is an American former sports shooter. He competed in the 50 metre pistol event at the 1960 Summer Olympics.

References

1933 births
Living people
American male sport shooters
Olympic shooters of the United States
Shooters at the 1960 Summer Olympics
Sportspeople from Los Angeles